Robert Walpole (1768 in England – 18 May 1834 in England) was an English amateur cricketer who made five known appearances in first-class cricket matches from 1793 to 1808.

Cricket career
He was mainly associated with Marylebone Cricket Club (MCC) and with Homerton Cricket Club.

References

External links
 CricketArchive record

1768 births
1834 deaths
English cricketers
English cricketers of 1787 to 1825
Marylebone Cricket Club cricketers
Old Etonians cricketers
Homerton Cricket Club cricketers